Afore Airstrip  is an airstrip in Afore, Papua New Guinea.

References

Airports in Papua New Guinea